USNS Bob Hope (T-AKR-300), the lead ship of its class of vehicle cargo ships for Army vehicle prepositioning, was a naval ship of the United States named after Bob Hope, the entertainer. Very few ships of the United States Navy have been named after a person who was alive at the time of the christening.

The contract to build her was awarded to Avondale Industries on 2 September 1993 and her keel was laid down on 29 May 1995. She was launched on 27 March 1997, and delivered on 18 November 1998.

A non-combatant roll-on/roll-off (RORO) vessel crewed by U.S. civilian mariners under the Navy's Military Sealift Command, Bob Hope and other ships of the class are used to preposition tanks, trucks and other wheeled vehicles and supplies needed to support an army heavy brigade.

She has seen service delivering supplies and equipment to the Balkans and Iraq.

Bob Hope was stricken from the Naval Vessel Register on 19 December 2022.

Features
The ship has two 110-ton Hagglunds deck crane pedestals mounted with twin cranes.

References

External links

 MSC Ship Inventory:  USNS Bob Hope
 

Bob Hope-class vehicle cargo ships
Auxiliary ships of the United States
1997 ships
Ships built in New Orleans
Bob Hope